Berber alphabet may refer to:
Tifinagh, the ancient Berber alphabet still used by the Tuareg and recently modernized and made official in Morocco
Berber Latin alphabet, widely used in modern Algerian and some Moroccan publishing, and used by most Berber linguists
 Berber Arabic alphabet, decreasingly used in Moroccan and Libyan Berber publishing
Shilha Arabic alphabet, traditionally used in the Moroccan Souss
Tuareg Latin alphabet, official in Mali and Niger